The vacancy of the Presidency of the Republic of Peru by declaration of permanent moral incapacity is one of the cases of vacancy of the Head of State contemplated in article 113 of the Constitution of Peru, whose origin dates back to the Political Constitution of Peru of 1839.

The process is different from an impeachment (contemplated in article 99 of the Constitution only for the offenses established in article 117), since it occurs from a declaration of the Congress of the Republic, which, if approved, creates a power vacuum, for which the legal succession proceeds . Said ''declaration of moral incapacity, regulated as Political Control in the Regulations of the Congress of the Republic, is considered by the Peruvian constitutional doctrine as a political trial sui generis.

 Procedure 
The declaration of the permanent moral incapacity of the President, corresponds to the Congress of the Republic, for which the following procedure established in the Regulations of the Congress:

The procedure for requesting a vacancy from the Presidency of the Republic, for the reasons set forth in subsection 2) of article 113 of the Constitution, is carried out in accordance with the following rules:
 
a) The vacancy request is formulated by means of a motion on the agenda, signed by no less than twenty percent of the legal number of Congressmen, specifying the factual and legal grounds on which it is based, as well as the documents that accredit it, or, failing that, the indication of the place where said documents are located. It takes precedence on the Agenda and is seen before any other pending motion on the agenda. Once the request is received, a copy of the same is sent, as soon as possible, to the President of the Republic.
 
b) For the admission of the vacancy request, the vote of at least forty percent of the able-bodied Congressmen is required. Voting is inevitably carried out in the session following the one in which the motion was made.
 
c) The Plenary of Congress agrees on the day and time for the debate and vote on the vacancy request, a session that cannot be held before the third day following the vote on the admission of the request or after the tenth, unless four-fifths of the number Congressmen agree to a shorter term debate and vote immediately. If necessary, a special session is summoned for this purpose. The President of the Republic whose vacancy is the subject of the request may personally exercise his right of defense or be assisted by a lawyer, for up to sixty minutes.
 
d) The agreement that declares the vacancy of the Presidency of the Republic, for the reasons set forth in subparagraph 2) of article 113 of the Constitution, requires a qualified vote of not less than 2/3 of the legal number of members of Congress and is recorded in a Resolution of Congress.
 
e) The resolution declaring the vacancy is published in the official gazette within twenty-four hours after receipt of the transmission sent by the Congress. Failing that, the President of Congress orders that it be published in one of the newspapers with the largest national circulation, without prejudice to the responsibilities that may arise.
 
f) The resolution declaring the vacancy is in effect from the moment the vacancy is communicated to the President of the Council of Ministers or its publication is made, whichever comes first.”

It is worth mentioning that until 2004 there was no procedure that clearly established the mode of application of the corresponding constitutional article, which is why the Judgment of the Constitutional Court No. 0006-2003-AI/TC  established as criteria that the removal of the president of the republic should only be approved with a qualified vote of at least two thirds of the legal number of congressmen, urging Congress to legislate on the matter in order to fill the legal vacuum that existed until then. In response to this, through Legislative Resolution of Congress No. 030-2003-CR, article 89-A was introduced into the Regulations of Congress.

Uses

References 

Political history of Peru
Political controversies
Government crises
Impeachment in Peru
Constitutional law